John Soares is an American film director, actor, editor, and fight choreographer. He is best known for his martial arts fight choreography in Sockbaby, Go Sukashi!, and The Danger Element.

Early life
Soares was born in Turlock, California, and grew up in the Central Valley working on his family's almond farm in the agricultural community of Hughson, California.

In 1999, Soares enrolled in film classes at Modesto Junior College where he met his future filmmaking partners Ben Beames and Justin Spurlock.

Career
In 2001, Soares founded Westhavenbrook Productions with partners Ben Beames and Justin Spurlock.

Soares co-directed Sockbaby (2004) with Doug TenNapel starring Soares, Cody Spurlock, Uriel Padilla, Justin Spurlock, Jon Heder, Doug Jones, Rob Schrab, Kate Freund, and Isaac C. Singleton Jr.

Soares also produced a series of humorous shorts called "The Vacuum Consortium", where he plays a mad scientist from another planet bent on world domination. One episode, "Reunion", featured a video call with musician and internet personality Doctor Steel.

Soares was featured in the Movie Kung Fu episode of Indy Mogul’s Backyard FX hosted by Erik Beck.

Soares and TenNapel, in association with Watanabe Entertainment and  Dentsu Inc., started production on Go Sukashi! (2009-2011) a digital series that parodies the 1970’s Super Sentai Japanese television series based on a character created by Shoko Nakagawa (who introduces each episode) starring Soares, Justin Spurlock, and Brooke Brodack.

Soares worked as a motion picture editor for Dreamworks Animation from 2014 to 2017, on the animated series Little Big Awesome and the second season of Niko and the Sword of Light at Titmouse, Inc. Shortly after entering the Motion Picture Editors Guild, he was hired by Warner Brothers Animation to edit another Animated series, Dorothy and the Wizard of Oz. The show was canceled a couple of months later and John began editing Looney Tunes Cartoons.

Soares directed The Danger Element (2017) starring Soares, Doug Jones, Cassie Meder, Kevan Hewett, Joshua Krebs, Justin Spurlock, and Ben Page. (In 2014 Soares also married his co-star, Cassie Meder.) He is now working on a sequel to The Danger Element entitled Jitni: Book of Lies.

Filmography

Awards and nominations

References

External links
 Official Website 
 

1981 births
Living people
People from Turlock, California
Modesto Junior College alumni
American Internet celebrities
Action choreographers
American martial artists
Film directors from California